Sphalerostola is a genus of moth in the family Xyloryctidae.

Species
Sphalerostola argobela Meyrick, 1931
Sphalerostola epierana (Turner, 1947)
Sphalerostola caustogramma Meyrick, 1927

References

Xyloryctidae
Xyloryctidae genera